Samurai Shodown Anthology (サムライスピリッツ 六番勝負 Samurai Supirittsu Rokuban Shobu, lit. Samurai Spirits: The Sixth Match) is a 2008 game compilation featuring the Samurai Shodown series released by SNK Playmore for the PlayStation 2, PlayStation Portable and Wii. This release does not include Samurai Shodown V Special, which added significant changes to the first version of the game. It was re-released as a downloadable game on the PlayStation Store for PSP on October 1, 2009.

Games included
 Samurai Shodown
Samurai Shodown II
Samurai Shodown III
Samurai Shodown IV
Samurai Shodown V
Samurai Shodown VI

References

External links
 

2009 video games
Samurai Shodown video games
SNK Playmore games
PlayStation 2 games
Wii games
PlayStation Portable games
SNK game compilations
Video games about samurai
Video games developed in the United States
Multiplayer and single-player video games
Terminal Reality games